V Aquilae (V Aql) is a carbon star and semiregular variable star in the constellation Aquila.

V Aquilae is a type of star with a spectrum that is dominated by strong absorption lines of the molecules C2 and CN, hence known as carbon stars. The enhanced levels of carbon in the atmosphere originate from recently nucleosynthesized material that has been dredged up to the surface by deep convection during temporary shell burning events known as thermal pulses.  Published spectral types for the star vary somewhat from C54 to C64, or N6 under an older system of classification.  The subscript 4 refers to the strength of the molecular carbon bands in the spectrum, an indicator of the relatively abundances of carbon in the atmosphere.

V Aquilae is a variable star of type SRb.  It has a published period of 400 days, but other periods are found including 350 days and 2,270 days.

References

External links
 Image V Aquilae

Aquila (constellation)
Semiregular variable stars
177336
Carbon stars
Aquilae, V
Asymptotic-giant-branch stars
7220
093666
Durchmusterung objects